Alex Grant is a Scottish-born American poet and instructor.

Biography

Background
He was born in Greenock, Inverclyde, Scotland, and grew up in Kirkcaldy, Fife, Scotland.

Personal life
Grant resides in Chapel Hill, North Carolina, with his wife, Tristi.

Literary career
Grant's work has appeared in Arts & Letters, Best New Poets 2007, Connecticut Review, The Missouri Review,  The Seattle Review and Verse Daily. Grant has appeared on WUNC's The State of Things show with Frank Stasio.

Awards and honors
Grant has been a six-time nominee for the Pushcart Prize, an American literary prize.

He has also received the following honors:
 Pavel Srut Poetry Fellowship, 2004 (a program of Western Michigan University; named in honor of Czech poet Pavel Srut)
 The Pablo Neruda Prize in Poetry Honorable Mention, 2005 (named in honor of Chilean poet Pablo Neruda)
 The Randall Jarrell Prize, 2006 (named in honor of American poet Randall Jarrell)
 Kakalak Poetry Prize, 2006
 Best New Poets 2007
 Oscar Arnold Young Award, 2007

Bibliography
His published poetry collections include:

See also

 List of Scottish writers
 List of people from North Carolina
 List of poets from the United States

References

External links
 redroom.com/member/alex-grant
 
 Alex Grant profile Directory of Writers, Poets & Writers website

Year of birth missing (living people)
20th-century births
20th-century American poets
21st-century American poets
American educators
English-language poets
Living people
People from Greenock
People from Kirkcaldy
People from Chapel Hill, North Carolina
Scottish educators
Scottish expatriates in the United States
Scottish poets
Poets from North Carolina